Onon may refer to:

 Onon (river), river in Mongolia and Russia
 Onon, Khentii, town in the Khentii Province of Mongolia
 Onon (crater), crater on Mars named after the river